James Hanly Morgan (born December 5, 1937 in Huntington, West Virginia) is an American politician and a Democratic member of the Cabell County Commission. Morgan served consecutively from his February 2001 appointment to fill the vacancy caused by the resignation of Representative Arley Johnson until January 2013, and from that point until January 2017 for District 16 and non-consecutively from January 1989 until January 1991 in a District 15 seat. In 2016 instead of running for another term in House of Delegates, Morgan ran for an open seat as a Cabell County Commissioner. He is currently a member of the Cabell County Commission.

Education
Morgan earned his BS degree from West Virginia University.

Elections
2012 With all three incumbent District 15 representatives redistricted to District 16, Morgan placed second in the May 8, 2012 Democratic Primary with 2,850 votes (35.6%), and placed third in the five-way three-position November 6, 2012 General election with 8,050 votes (20.8%) behind Democratic Representative Kevin Craig and Republican Carol Miller and ahead of non-selectees Sean Hornbuckle (D) and Mike Davis (R).
1988 Morgan was initially elected to District 15 in the 1988 Democratic Primary and the November 3, 1988 General election.
2002 Morgan and incumbent Representatives Craig and Margarette Leach were unopposed for the 2002 Democratic Primary and were re-elected in the five-way three-position November 5, 2002 General election.
2004 Morgan and incumbent Representatives Craig and Leach were unopposed for the 2004 Democratic Primary, and were re-elected in the six-way three-position November 2, 2004 General election.
2006 Morgan and incumbent Representatives Craig and Leach were challenged in the five-way 2006 Democratic Primary but all placed; Morgan and Craig were re-elected in the six-way three-position November 7, 2006 General election alongside Republican nominee Carol Miller, unseating Representative Leach.
2008 Morgan placed first in the three-way May 13, 2008 Democratic Primary with 5,321 votes (37.9%), and placed second in the six-way three-position November 4, 2008 General election with 9,397 votes (20.9%) behind incumbent Craig (D) and ahead of incumbent Miller (R), and non-selectees Carl Eastham (D), James Carden (R), and Paula Stewart (R).
2010 Morgan and Representative Craig were challenged in the five-way May 11, 2010 Democratic Primary where Morgan placed second with 2,461 votes (26.1%), and placed third in the six-way three-position November 2, 2010 General election with 6,188 votes (18.5%) behind Representatives Craig (D) and Miller (R) and ahead of non-selectees Matthew Woelfel (D), Patrick Lucas (R), and Douglas Franklin (R).

References

External links
Official page at the West Virginia Legislature
Campaign site
 
James Morgan at Ballotpedia
Jim Morgan at OpenSecrets

1937 births
Living people
Democratic Party members of the West Virginia House of Delegates
Politicians from Huntington, West Virginia
West Virginia University alumni
21st-century American politicians